Princess Alexandra Therese Marie of Anhalt (4 April 1868 - 26 August 1958) was a Princess of Anhalt and member of the House of Ascania by birth. As the wife of Sizzo, Prince of Schwarzburg, she was a Princess of Schwarzburg by marriage.

Early life
Princess Alexandra was born on 4 April 1868 in Dessau as the youngest child of Frederick I, Duke of Anhalt and Princess Antoinette of Saxe-Altenburg.

Marriage
In the late 1880s false rumours of an engagement between Prince Albert Victor of Wales and Princess Alexandra emerged when in fact the couple had never even met.

In Dessau on 25 January 1897 Princess Alexandra was married to Prince Sizzo of Schwarzburg.

After their marriage the couple lived in Großharthau.

Children

Ancestry

References 

1868 births
1958 deaths
House of Ascania
Princesses of Schwarzburg
German people of French descent
Daughters of monarchs